The year 1698 in music involved some significant events.

Events
Henry Purcell's widow publishes the first volume of Orpheus Britannicus.
Antonio Stradivari makes the "Cabriac" violin.

Published popular music

Classical music
Johann Sebastian Bach – Ach, was soll ich Sünder machen, BWV 770
Sébastien de Brossard – Retribue servo tuo, SdB.004
Antonio Caldara – Maddalena ai piedi di Cristo
Marc-Antoine Charpentier 
Missa Assumpta est Maria, H.11
In nativitatem Domini canticum, H.421
Daniel Danielis – Cœleste Convivium del Signor (Coll. Brossard)
Michel Richard Delalande – Regina Coeli, S.53
Sebastian Knüpfer – Ecce quam bonum et quam iucundum (Psalm 133), for 5 solo voices, 5-part choir, 2 violins, 3 violas, bassoon, and basso continuo
Johann Krieger – Anmuthige Clavier-Übung (Nuremberg), a collection of 25 pieces for organ, including ricercars, fugues, preludes, etc.
August Kühnel – 14 Sonate ò Partite ad una o due viole da gamba, con il basso continuo (Kassel)
Isabella Leonarda – Salmi concertati a 4 voci con strumenti, Op. 19 (Bologna)
Christian Liebe – O Heiland aller Welt ich muß dir sehnlich klagen
Georg Muffat – Florilegium Secundum (Passau)
Daniel Purcell – 6 Sonatas or Solos
Johann Abraham Schmierer – Zodiaci musici
Giuseppe Torelli – Concerti musicali a quattro op.6

Opera
Richard Leveridge – The Island Princess
Luigi Manza – Tito Manlio; Partenope
Alessandro Scarlatti 
La donna ancora è fedele
Il prigioniero fortunato, R.346.36

Births
January 3 – Metastasio, born Pietro Antonio Domenico Trapassi, poet and opera librettist (died 1782)
July 24 – František Jiránek, composer (died 1778) 
September 8 – François Francoeur, violinist and composer (died 1787) 
date unknown
Pietro Auletta, composer (died 1771)
Antonio Bioni, composer (died 1739)
Riccardo Broschi, composer (died 1756)
Célestin Harst, priest, organist and composer (died 1778)
probable – Giovanni Battista Sammartini, composer (died 1775)

Deaths
date unknown – Thomas Connellan, composer and harpist (born c.1640)
probable – Nicola Matteis, violinist and composer (born c.1670)

References

 
17th century in music
Music by year